Brian Foulkes (born 21 November 1957) is a South African cricketer. He played in one first-class match for Border in 1983/84.

See also
 List of Border representative cricketers

References

External links
 

1957 births
Living people
South African cricketers
Border cricketers
People from Luanshya